Baruth may refer to
 Baruth/Mark, town in Brandenburg, Germany
 Jack Baruth (born 1971), American automotive journalist and race car driver
 Philip Baruth (born 1962), American politician, novelist and biographer